Mehdi Yarrahi (born 14 November 1981 in Ahvaz) is an Iranian singer, musician, and activist living in Tehran.

He began his professional career in 2010.

In December 2018 in a concert due to wearing the uniform of workers arrested in 2017-2018 labor protests in Khuzestan and for releasing the music video of Pare Sang (Broken Stone), he was banned from performing and appearing on stage/TV by the Ministry of Culture and Islamic Guidance and the Islamic Republic of Iran Broadcasting. After six months and easing the ban from singing in 17 July 2019, he was again banned from performing in February 2020.

Awards 

 Best pop album (for the album Emperor), experts' choice, the second annual ceremony of Musicema in 2013
 Best pop song (for the song Emperor), experts' choice, the second annual ceremony of Musicema in 2013
Best people's choice TV theme song (for the song Sazesh 'Compromise''' for the TV show Mah-e Asal (TV series)), the first TV ceremony of the program Se Setareh in 2014
Barbad award for the best pop singer of the year for the album Ayneh Ghadi [Full Length Mirror] in Fajr Music Festival (September 2016 – 2017)
Best singer of the year in regard to song choice in the 2nd Afshin Yadollahi Songwriting Awards ceremony in 2018.

 Rebel Music 
Yarrahi, an Ahwazi Arab, is known for his highly controversial works and is one of the very few artists who maintained a daringly close take on social developments within the Iranian community. In 2019 The Economist magazine reported the Iranian pop star challenges the regime with hit song criticizing Iran-Iraq war. In 2017 Mehdi Yarrahi won the award for best pop album from the Ministry of Culture and Islamic Guidance. But after the video of the anti-war song “Pare Sang” (Broken Stone) in 2019 the regime thinks Mr Yarrahi is singing out of tune. In the video the singer wears a Russian hat, English boots, an American overcoat adorned with military medals, an armband with a swastika on it and a [soldier's] plaque. Devastating images appear around him: a man seems to have set himself on fire, buildings collapse and families queue at a dry tap. "Don't know why I can't understand this, Why was there so much delay in ending the war?," Yarrahi sings in his video clip. "Another generation gone to the war, with no return." Etemad daily reported that Yarrahi banned from performing and publishing any of his works a few days after releasing the song.

 Azan (Call to Prayer) 
In 2014, Mehdi Yarrahi performed and released the single Azan with his own distinctive style and melody, which is considered as one of his most visited and popular tracks in the world and many people describe it “the most beautiful call to prayer ever heard”. The Azan often goes viral and internet users show interaction as well-known figures sharing and admiring the Azan. Raseef22 described it as "from Turkey to the America, he held the world enthralled by his melodious Azan while he is banned singing in his own country. Yes, we are talking about the Iranian artist and singer, Mehdi Yarrahi." Raseef22 reported in 2020 a clip of Turkish President Recep Tayyip Erdogan reshared widely on Turkish social media listening and enjoying this call to prayer. Mohamed Hadid praised this performance, writing in his Instagram page: "needs no explanation. A beautiful voice calling you to pray. Mehdi Yarrahi is the voice of an angel." Eric Abidal (a former Barcelona player and director), French Montana (Moroccan-American rapper), Sibel Can (Turkish singer), and Dida Diafat (a world champion in Muay Thai kickboxing) were some other well-known figures who attracted the attention of the internet users and media by posting Mehdi Yarrahi's Azan on their pages.

Raseef22 also mentioned the fact that Mehdi Yarrahi was banned from performing in his country due to his attitude and social activities, adding the Islamic Republic of Iran Broadcasting even avoided mentioning the name of the singer when broadcasting the news about the song Azan published by a famous football player in his page.

 Discography 

 Albums 
 2011: Set me free 2013: Emperor 2015: Like a statue 2017: Full Length Mirror''

Singles 
 2010: "Empty coffin" (Taboote Khali)
 2011: "Border" (Marz)
 2011: "My heart is wherever you are" (Har Jaye Donyaei Delam Oonjast)
 2011: "tonight has also gone" (Emshabam Gozasht)
 2011: "More attractive" (Jazabtar)
 2011: "Reward" (Eydi)
 2012: "Wall" (Divar)
 2012: "look at me" (Be Man Negah Kon)
 2012: "Say Something" (Ye Chizi Begoo)
 2012: "Dandelion" (Ghasedak)
 2013: "The important thing is" (Mohem Ine)
 2013: "Compromise" (Sazesh)
 2013: "Who taught you (arabic)"
 2014: "Spring (the Arabic)" (Fasle Bahar)
 2014: "Gazelle (Ghazal, arabic)"
 2014: "Thy tears" (Boghze To)
 2014: "Call to prayer" (Azan)
 2014: "May God be with you" (Khoda Be Hamrat)
 2014: "fireplace" (Atashkade)
 2015: "Don't think about me" (Fekre Man Nabash)
 2015: "chaos" (Ashoob)
 2015: "Why won't you come" (Chera Nemiresi)
 2016: "Soil" (Khak)
 2016: "Don't say I didn't tell you" (Nagoo Nagofti)
 2016: "Breath" (Nafas)
 2016: "Need" (Hajat)
 2017: "Coldness is near" (Sarma Nazdike)
 2017: "The things that I've heard" (Che chiza shenidam)
 2017: "21 days later" (Bisto yek rooz ba'd)
 2017: "Your eyes" (Cheshm e to)
 2017: "Autumn" (Paeez)
 2018: "Hayek" (Arabic)
 2018: "Indoctrination" (Talghin)
 2018: "Cool" (Sarsaam)
 2018: "Pare Sang" (Broken Stone)
 2019: "Enkar" (Denial)
 2019: "Ahle Nakhal" (From Palm)
 2019: "Nemisheh Edameh Dad" (Can't continue)
 2019: "Tolou Mikonam" (I will rise)
 2020: "Asrar" (Secrets)
 2020: "Dokhtaraneh" (Girly)      
2020: "Laakposht" (Turtle)
2021: "Aks Shod" (Turned in to a Picture)
2021: "Ahwak"

References

External links 

 Mehdi Yarrahi Official website
 
 Mehdi Yarrahi on Spotify

Iranian composers
Living people
People from Ahvaz
Iranian pop singers
21st-century Iranian male singers
1981 births